Entrepierres is a commune in the Alpes-de-Haute-Provence department in southeastern France.

Population

See also
Communes of the Alpes-de-Haute-Provence department

References

External links
 a wiki (mostly French) about Entrepierres

Communes of Alpes-de-Haute-Provence
Alpes-de-Haute-Provence communes articles needing translation from French Wikipedia